Maghama  is a town and commune in Mauritania.

Communes of Mauritania
Gorgol Region